Hafford is a town in the RM of Redberry, Saskatchewan, Canada, consisting of 414 residents at the 2021 Canadian census. It is located near Redberry Lake, which consists of only salt water.

History
The first overseer for the village of Hafford was T.G. Bavin in 1914.  The Hafford Village Council and Board of Trade requested a doctor, and Dr. Whitemarsh was appointed for the village.  The early community was first served by Luxembourg Post Office. The early village had three lumber yards, a general store, I.H.C. agency, a poolroom, livery barn, hardware, and post office.  In 1913 the Canadian Bank of Commerce and the first restaurant opened.  The hotel and bar were established in 1914. Power came to Hafford in 1916, and the Hafford Rural Telephone Company was established in 1916.  The Hafford hospital was built in 1922.  Hafford was served by the Ukrainian Catholic Church established 1911, the Ukrainian Orthodox church built 1909, the Roman Catholic Church erected about the same time.  The Anglican church was built in 1918, and the Methodist church which was erected in Hafford moved to Richard. The Dominion Government Illustration Station was operated between 1932-1955.  This station tested grains, and fertilizers and improved livestock.

Demographics 

Education
The Hafford community was served firstly by the Whiteberry School District which constructed their school building over two years 1906-1908, opening in 1909 followed by the Rus School District opening 1910.  In this area, the Alberton School District, Gooseberry School District,  Slawa School District and the Craigmore School District were all organised in 1912.  The Hafford School District and Nauka School Districts were organised in 1914, Langley School District 1916, and both the Lost Lake School District, and the Canada School District in 1918.

Transportation
Historically, the railroad connecting Prince Albert and North Battleford was laid in 1913, and upon the rail line, a site was chosen for the village of Hafford site.  The community is served by Hafford Airport which is located 1 nautical mile (1.9 km) northwest and formerly  by the now removed Carlton Trail Railway that ran parallel to Highway 40.

Notable people
Sonia Scurfield, the second woman (and the only Canadian woman) to have her name engraved on the Stanley Cup
Allen B. Sulatycky, former Associate Chief Justice of the Court of Queen's Bench of Alberta
Jason Herter, former professional hockey player, played one game with the NHL's New York Islanders

Climate

See also 

 List of communities in Saskatchewan
 List of towns in Saskatchewan
 Redberry Lake, Saskatchewan
 Twisted Trees

References

Redberry No. 435, Saskatchewan
Towns in Saskatchewan
Division No. 16, Saskatchewan